Seth Michael Etherton (born October 17, 1976) is an American baseball coach and former pitcher, who is the current pitching coach for the USC Trojans. He played college baseball at USC from 1995 to 1998. He played in Major League Baseball (MLB) for 4 seasons, with his longest tenure as a player coming with the Anaheim Angels.

Etherton was born in Laguna Beach, California. He attended Dana Hills High School in Dana Point, California. After graduating from Dana Hills, Etherton enrolled at USC, where he was a Three-time All-American, and twice named the Pac-10 Conference Baseball Pitcher of the Year.

The Anaheim Angels selected Etherton in the first round of the 1998 Major League Baseball draft. He played 4 seasons professionally as a pitcher in the MLB, with Anaheim in 2000, the Cincinnati Reds in 2003, the Oakland Athletics in 2005, and Kansas City Royals in 2006. He also played professionally for the Kia Tigers, and the Uni-President 7-Eleven Lions.

High School/College career
Etherton played at Dana Hills High School and the University of Southern California. In 1995 and 1996, he played collegiate summer baseball with the Chatham A's of the Cape Cod Baseball League, was named a league all-star in 1995, and was instrumental in the team's 1996 league championship series victory. He was a 1st team College All-American at USC and helped the team win the 1998 College World Series.

Professional career

Anaheim Angels
Etherton was drafted by the Anaheim Angels in the 1st round of the 1998 MLB draft. He made his major league debut on May 26, 2000 for the Angels against the Kansas City Royals. He started the game and pitched five innings while giving up three runs. He recorded his first win on June 13, 2000 against the Tampa Bay Devil Rays. He was 5-1 for the Angels in 11 starts in 2000 with a 5.52 ERA.

Cincinnati Reds
On December 10, 2000 he was traded by the Angels to the Cincinnati Reds for  shortstop Wilmy Caceras. He missed all of the 2001 season and most of the 2002 season because of shoulder surgery and then made seven starts for the Reds in 2003. He was 2-4 with a 6.90 ERA in those appearances. He spent the entire 2004 season in the minor leagues with the AAA Louisville Bats.

Oakland Athletics
Etherton signed as a minor league free agent with the Oakland Athletics for the 2005 season. He spent most of the season with the AAA Sacramento River Cats but made three starts for the Athletics when Rich Harden was injured in May. He was 1-1 with a 6.63 ERA in those starts.

Kansas City Royals
He was signed as a minor league free agent by the Kansas City Royals in November 2005 and then selected in the minor league portion of the Rule 5 draft by the San Diego Padres.  The Padres traded him back to the Royals on May 26, 2006 for cash. He was 1-1 with a 9.39 ERA in 2 starts with the Royals while spending most of the season with the AAA Omaha Royals.

2007–2008
In 2007, Etherton played for Kia Tigers in the Korea Baseball Organization and went 2-2 with a 4.22 ERA before being released. While in Korea, Etherton suffered from a mysterious stomach illness that may have led to his release. After his release and return to America, his symptoms subsided and he signed with the Florida Marlins organization. With the Marlins he made 1 appearance for the Jupiter Hammerheads and 2 for the Albuquerque Isotopes.

In 2008, he played 2 games for the Long Beach Armada in the independent Golden Baseball League.

Minor leagues
In December 2008, he signed a minor league contract with the Arizona Diamondbacks and played the entire season for the AAA Reno Aces, where he made 26 starts and was 11-8 with a 5.04 ERA.

In April 2010, he signed with the Los Angeles Dodgers and was assigned to the AAA Albuquerque Isotopes. He appeared in 19 games, with 17 starts, and finished 5-7 with a 5.33 ERA.

Coaching career
Etherton served as the pitching coach for the Dayton Dragons.

References

External links

Baseball Cube

1976 births
Albuquerque Isotopes players
American expatriate baseball players in Canada
American expatriate baseball players in South Korea
American expatriate baseball players in Taiwan
Anaheim Angels players
Baseball players from California
Chatham Anglers players
Chattanooga Lookouts players
Cincinnati Reds players
Dayton Dragons players
Erie SeaWolves players
Edmonton Trappers players
Jupiter Hammerheads players
Kansas City Royals players
KBO League pitchers
Kia Tigers players
Living people
Long Beach Armada players
Louisville Bats players
Major League Baseball pitchers
Midland Angels players
Norwich Navigators players
Oakland Athletics players
Omaha Royals players
Portland Beavers players
Reno Aces players
Sacramento River Cats players
Uni-President 7-Eleven Lions players
USC Trojans baseball players
All-American college baseball players
San Francisco Dons baseball coaches
USC Trojans baseball coaches